Artashes Armenakovich Kalaydzhan (born 28 December 1971) is a Russian professional football coach and a former player of Armenian descent.

Club career
He made his professional debut in the Soviet Second League B in 1991 for FC Zhemchuzhina Sochi.

References

1971 births
Sportspeople from Sochi
Living people
Soviet footballers
Russian footballers
Association football midfielders
Russian sportspeople of Armenian descent
Russian Premier League players
FC Zhemchuzhina Sochi players
FC Chernomorets Novorossiysk players
FC SKA Rostov-on-Don players
FC Volgar Astrakhan players
Russian football managers